James Thompson (born 16 December 1978) is a British professional mixed martial artist who competes in the heavyweight division. A professional competitor since 2003, Thompson has also formerly competed for PRIDE FC, Bellator MMA, Cage Rage, EliteXC, Sengoku, DREAM, KSW, Rizin, and the SFL.

Background
Born in England, Thompson grew up in Rochdale playing rugby league. Widely considered to be a talented player, at one point in time he did consider pursuing a professional career in rugby. Ultimately, he ended up working as debt collector and nightclub bouncer, whilst also competing in amateur bodybuilding. Thompson then took up the sport of wrestling and competed in several matches before eventually seeing an MMA bout featuring Don Frye (whom he would later fight and beat at PRIDE 34: Kamikaze), which ultimately inspired him to pursue a career in MMA.

Mixed martial arts career

Early career
Thompson began his mixed martial arts career fighting in the British promotion Ultimate Combat (UC). He developed a rivalry with Mark "The Shark" Goddard after their bout in Ultimate Combat 6: Battle in the Cage. Thompson won the bout by referee stoppage, but Goddard disputed the result, saying that Thompson had tapped earlier to one of his armbar attempts. A rematch at Ultimate Combat 8: Retribution resulted in an 18-second knockout victory for Thompson. After five straight victories, he faced his first loss to Georgian Tengiz Tedoradze at Ultimate Combat X. Tedoradze managed to stop Thompson's initial charge and won by doctor stoppage after the second round. Thompson bounced back with a UC Championship bout against Ultimate Fighting Championship (UFC) veteran Dan Severn at Ultimate Combat 11: Eyes of the Beast.

PRIDE
After defeating Severn, Thompson made his PRIDE Fighting Championship debut at PRIDE 28 to face Alexander Emelianenko at PRIDE 28: High Octane. Despite losing the fight in only eleven seconds, he remained with the organisation, earning quick victories over Henry Armstrong Miller and Giant Silva. Thompson became known to Pride fans for his penchant for rushing at opponents at the opening bell, which became known as 'Gong and Dash'. During this time, Thompson alternated appearances in Japan with fights in British organisations such as Cage Rage.

Thompson's career took a downturn with three consecutive losses to Kazuyuki Fujita, Rob Broughton and Jon Olav Einemo. However, he followed up with an upset victory over Olympic judo gold medalist Hidehiko Yoshida at PRIDE Shockwave 2006. He next suffered a quick KO at the hands of super heavyweight boxer Eric 'Butterbean' Esch at Cage Rage 20. In his final appearance in Pride, Thompson dominated against UFC veteran Don Frye to a first round stoppage at PRIDE 34. Thompson followed up with his final appearance in Cage Rage, losing to Neil "Goliath" Grove by knockout in just 10 seconds. Thompson cited a lack of quality heavyweight training partners for his poor performances, and switched training camps to join Randy Couture's Xtreme Couture.

EliteXC
Thompson made his EliteXC debut against undefeated 8-0 fighter Brett Rogers at the EliteXC: Street Certified on 16 February 2008. Rogers knocked Thompson out in the first round.  Despite this loss, Thompson followed up with a headlining appearance at EliteXC: Primetime against streetfighter Kimbo Slice. Entering the fight with a considerably swollen cauliflower ear, Thompson managed to control the first two rounds with effective ground and pound. However, both fighters came into the third round substantially winded. Slice landed several unanswered blows to Thompson's face whilst on his feet, one of which burst his cauliflower ear, prompting the referee to stop the fight and declare a TKO in Slice's favour.

Strike Box/Titans Fighting incident
On 6 February 2009, Thompson fought Steve Bossé at Strike Box/Titans Fighting's inaugural event in Quebec, Canada. The event was originally scheduled to be under Strike Box's own rules where only boxing, takedowns and standing submissions were allowed, but the rules were not accepted by the province's athletic commission in time for the event. It was therefore conducted under MMA rules instead. Before the event some fighters agreed to fight under Strike Box's proposed rules as a gentleman's agreement, though the referee in charge would not have any choice but to allow ground fighting were it to happen. Thompson, who later claimed to be unaware of the agreement,  proceeded to take down, mount and ground and pound Bosse - as allowed under MMA rules - after Bosse went for a standing guillotine choke at the start of the fight. This caused the audience to boo Thompson and the referee, unaware of that the fight was being conducted under MMA rules. Beer cans and eventually chairs were then thrown into the ring, prompting referee Yves Lavigne to stop the match. Although it was originally declared a no contest the fight and its result doesn't appear on either fighter's official fight records.

Sengoku
Thompson's fought on 20 March at Sengoku 7 against New Zealand fighter Jim York, which he lost by KO.

DREAM
Thompson lost a fight with Alistair Overeem on 25 October 2009 at Dream 12

Strikeforce
Thompson revealed at the Dream 12 press conference that he has three more fights for his Strikeforce contract.

ZT Fight Night: The Tournament
Thompson competed in the ZT Fight Night Tournament for £10,000 along with 7 other fighters on 30 January 2010. He avenged his first career loss against Tengiz Tedoradze in the quarterfinals, his first win in nearly three years, breaking a five-loss streak. He was then knocked out by the eventual tournament winner, Rob Broughton.

DREAM return
Rumours that Thompson could face Ikuhisa Minowa at DREAM 16 surfaced. However it was later revealed that Minowa would face Satoshi Ishii at DREAM 16. Thompsony instead fought DEEP veteran Yusuke Kawaguchi and lost via a controversial Split Decision. Many believed the two majority decision judges were biased towards the Japanese home country fighter after Thompson retained top position and did much more damage at the end of the first and throughout the second round.

Konfrontacja Sztuk Walki
Thompson fought five-time "World’s Strongest Man" Mariusz Pudzianowski at KSW XVI on 21 May 2011.  He won the fight via submission in the second round.

In the rematch at KSW XVII, Thompson lost a controversial decision. After the fight, he launched a profane verbal assault directed at the promotion. Two days later the promotion changed the result to a No Contest, claiming an error in scorecard tallying. Thompson, however, has not participated in any subsequent KSW events.

Super Fight League
Thompson fought in the main event of the Super Fight League's inaugural event, SFL 1, against Bob Sapp. He won the fight when Sapp injured his leg as he was being taken down by Thompson, forcing him to tap out to the injury.

He next competed at Super Fight League 3 against Bobby Lashley. The outcome was yet another close and controversial decision, this time going unanimously in Thompson's favour, giving him his first winning streak since 2005.

UXC
Thompson returned to action once his orbital bone had healed from his previous war with Lashley on 1 March 2014 against UFC veteran Colin Robinson, as part of the UXC 2 card at the Odyssey Arena, Northern Ireland. He won via arm triangle choke in the second round.

Bellator MMA
It was announced on 23 May that Thompson had been signed by Bellator MMA and would make his promotional debut against Eric Prindle in the headlining bout of Bellator 121 on 6 June 2014. Thompson dominated Prindle and won by TKO in the first round at 1:55 minutes.

Thompson was expected to face UFC veteran Houston Alexander in the co-main event on 17 October 2014 at Bellator 129. However, on 10 October 2014 it was announced that Thompson was pulled from the fight due to injury.

Thompson was scheduled to face Bobby Lashley in a rematch at Bellator 134 on 27 February 2015. However, Lashley pulled out of the fight due to injury. The fight was rescheduled for 19 June 2015 at Bellator 138. In early June, it was revealed that Dan Charles would instead face Lashley at the event due to an injury sustained by Thompson.

The rematch with Lashley eventually took place on 6 November 2015 at Bellator 145. Thompson lost the fight via TKO in the first round.

In April 2016, Bellator President Scott Coker announced on ESPN’s SportsCenter that Thompson would have a rematch against Kimbo Slice in the main event of Bellator 158, which would take place on 16 July 2016 at London’s O2 Arena. Slice died unexpectedly on 6 June 2016.

Rizin Fighting Federation
In his debut for the Rizin Fighting Federation, Thompson faced Tsuyoshi Kohsaka on 29 December 2015.  He lost the fight via TKO in the second round.

Bellator MMA
After two years hiatus, Thompson faced Phi De Fries on Bellator 191 on December 15. 2017. He lost the fight via a submission in round one.

Thompson was suspended for one year by the Mohegan Tribe Department of Athletic Regulations and fined two thousands dollars for testing positive from a in competition sample collected for steroid dirostanolone in competition at Bellator 191.

Championships and accomplishments
Ultimate Combat
Ultimate Combat Heavyweight Championship (1 time)

Underdog Xtreme Championships
UXC British Heavyweight Championship (1 time)

Film
In April 2012, Thompson was cast for the role of The Berserker in Outpost: Rise of the Spetsnaz.

Mixed martial arts record

|-
|Loss
|align=center|20–17 (2)
|Phil De Fries
|Submission (guillotine choke)
|Bellator 191
|
|align=center|1
|align=center|1:33
|Newcastle, England
|
|-
| Loss
|align=center|20–16 (2)
|Tsuyoshi Kosaka
|TKO (punches)
|Rizin Fighting Federation 1: Day 1
|
|align=center|2
|align=center|1:58
|Saitama, Japan
|
|-
| Loss
|align=center|20–15 (2)
|Bobby Lashley
|TKO (punches)
|Bellator 145
|
|align=center|1
|align=center|0:54
|St. Louis, Missouri, United States
|
|-
| Win
| align=center| 20–14 (2)
| Eric Prindle
| TKO (punches)
| Bellator 121
| 
| align=center| 1
| align=center| 1:55
| Thackerville, Oklahoma, United States
| 
|-
| Win
| align=center| 19–14 (2)
| Colin Robinson
| Submission (arm-triangle choke)
| Underdog Xtreme Championships 2
| 
| align=center| 2
| align=center| 2:47
| Belfast, Northern Ireland
|
|-
| Win
| align=center| 18–14 (2)
| Bobby Lashley
| Decision (unanimous)
| Super Fight League 3: Lashley vs. Thompson
| 
| align=center| 3
| align=center| 5:00
| Delhi, India
|
|-
| Win
| align=center| 17–14 (2)
| Bob Sapp
| TKO (leg injury)
| Super Fight League 1: Thompson vs. Sapp
| 
| align=center| 1
| align=center| 3:17
| Mumbai, India
|
|-
| NC
| align=center| 16–14 (2)
| Mariusz Pudzianowski
| No Contest (overturned)
| KSW 17: Revenge
| 
| align=center| 2
| align=center| 5:00
| Lódz, Poland
| 
|-
| Win
| align=center| 16–14
| Mariusz Pudzianowski
| Submission (arm-triangle choke)
| KSW 16: Khalidov vs. Lindland
| 
| align=center| 2
| align=center| 1:06
| Gdańsk, Poland
| 
|-
| Loss
| align=center| 15–14
| Yusuke Kawaguchi
| Decision (split)
| DREAM 16
| 
| align=center| 2
| align=center| 5:00
| Nagoya, Aichi, Japan
|Super Heavyweight bout.
|-
| Loss
| align=center| 15–13
| Miodrag Petkovic
| KO (punch)
| Millennium Fight Challenge 4
| 
| align=center| 1
| align=center| 1:01
| Split, Croatia, Croatia
| 
|-
| Loss
| align=center| 15–12
| Rob Broughton
| KO (punch)
| ZT Fight Night: Heavyweights Collide
| 
| align=center| 2
| align=center| 2:28
| Hove, England
| 
|-
| Win
| align=center| 15–11
| Tengiz Tedoradze
| TKO (punches)
| ZT Fight Night: Heavyweights Collide
| 
| align=center| 2
| align=center| 2:55
| Hove, England
| 
|-
| Loss
| align=center| 14–11
| Alistair Overeem
| Submission (standing guillotine choke)
| Dream 12
| 
| align=center| 1
| align=center| 0:33
| Osaka, Osaka, Japan
| 
|-
| Loss
| align=center| 14–10
| Jim York
| KO (punch)
| World Victory Road Presents: Sengoku 7
| 
| align=center| 1
| align=center| 4:33
| Tokyo, Japan
| 
|-
|NC
|align="center"|14–8 (1)
|
|No Contest
|Titans Fighting
|
|align="center"|N/A
|align="center"|N/A
|Montreal, Quebec, Canada
|
|-
| Loss
| align=center| 14–9 (1)
| Kimbo Slice
| TKO (punches)
| EliteXC: Primetime
| 
| align=center| 3
| align=center| 0:38
| Newark, New Jersey, United States
| 
|-
| Loss
| align=center| 14–8
| Brett Rogers
| KO (punches)
| EliteXC: Street Certified
| 
| align=center| 1
| align=center| 2:24
| Miami, Florida, United States
| 
|-
| Loss
| align=center| 14–7
| Neil Grove
| KO (punch)
| Cage Rage 22
| 
| align=center| 1
| align=center| 0:10
| London, England
| 
|-
| Win
| align=center| 14–6
| Don Frye
| TKO (punches)
| PRIDE 34
| 
| align=center| 1
| align=center| 6:23
| Saitama, Saitama, Japan
| 
|-
| Loss
| align=center| 13–6
| Butterbean
| KO (punches)
| Cage Rage 20
| 
| align=center| 1
| align=center| 0:43
| London, England
| 
|-
| Win
| align=center| 13–5
| Hidehiko Yoshida
| TKO (punches)
| PRIDE: Shockwave 2006
| 
| align=center| 1
| align=center| 7:50
| Saitama, Saitama, Japan
| 
|-
| Loss
| align=center| 12–5
| John-Olav Einemo
| Submission (armbar)
| 2H2H: Pride & Honor
| 
| align=center| 1
| align=center| 4:18
| Netherlands
| 
|-
| Loss
| align=center| 12–4
| Rob Broughton
| KO (punches)
| Cage Rage 17
| 
| align=center| 3
| align=center| 5:00
| London, England
| 
|-
| Loss
| align=center| 12–3
| Kazuyuki Fujita
| KO (punch)
| PRIDE: Total Elimination Absolute
| 
| align=center| 1
| align=center| 8:25
| Osaka, Japan
|
|-
| Win
| align=center| 12–2
| Giant Silva
| TKO (soccer kicks)
| PRIDE: Shockwave 2005
| 
| align=center| 1
| align=center| 1:28
| Saitama, Saitama, Japan
| 
|-
| Win
| align=center| 11–2
| Alexandru Lungu
| TKO (knees and punches)
| PRIDE 30
| 
| align=center| 1
| align=center| 2:13
| Saitama, Saitama, Japan
|
|-
| Win
| align=center| 10–2
| Andy Costello
| TKO (punches)
| Cage Rage 13
| 
| align=center| 1
| align=center| 2:33
| London, England
| 
|-
| Win
| align=center| 9–2
| Autimio Antonia
| KO (punch)
| Urban Destruction 2
| 
| align=center| 1
| align=center| 0:54
| Bristol, England
| 
|-
| Win
| align=center| 8–2
| Henry Armstrong Miller
| KO (punch)
| PRIDE: Bushido 8
| 
| align=center| 1
| align=center| 1:21
| Nagoya, Japan
| 
|-
| Win
| align=center| 7–2
| Nikolajus Cilkinas
| TKO (punches)
| Urban Destruction 1
| 
| align=center| 1
| align=center| 1:04
| England
| 
|-
| Loss
| align=center| 6–2
| Alexander Emelianenko
| KO (punch)
| PRIDE 28
| 
| align=center| 1
| align=center| 0:11
| Saitama, Saitama, Japan
| 
|-
| Win
| align=center| 6–1
| Dan Severn
| Decision (unanimous)
| UC 11: Wrath of the Beast
| 
| align=center| 5
| align=center| 5:00
| Bristol, England
|
|-
| Loss
| align=center| 5–1
| Tengiz Tedoradze
| TKO (referee stoppage)
| Ultimate Combat X
| 
| align=center| 2
| align=center| 5:00
| England
| 
|-
| Win
| align=center| 5–0
| Aaron Marsa
| Submission (neck injury)
| UC 9: Rebellion
| 
| align=center| 1
| align=center| 0:20
| Bristol, England
| 
|-
| Win
| align=center| 4–0
| Marc Goddard
| KO (punches)
| UC 8: Retribution
| 
| align=center| 1
| align=center| 0:18
| Chippenham, England
| 
|-
| Win
| align=center| 3–0
| Richie Cranny
| Submission (arm-triangle choke)
| UC 7: World Domination
| 
| align=center| 1
| align=center| 1:34
| Chippenham, England
| 
|-
| Win
| align=center| 2–0
| Marc Goddard
| TKO (submission to punches)
| UC 6: Battle in the Cage
| 
| align=center| 2
| align=center| 0:47
| Chippenham, England
| 
|-
| Win
| align=center| 1–0
| Will Elworthy
| Submission (forearm choke)
| Ground & Pound 2
| 
| align=center| 1
| align=center| 4:22
| England
|

See also
List of male mixed martial artists

Notes and references

External links

James Thompson "WarWagon" Fan Club
"Colossal Concerns", Thompson's official blog

Doping cases in mixed martial arts
English male mixed martial artists
English sportspeople in doping cases
Heavyweight mixed martial artists
Super heavyweight mixed martial artists
Mixed martial artists utilizing boxing
Mixed martial artists utilizing wrestling
Mixed martial artists utilizing Brazilian jiu-jitsu
Sportspeople from Rochdale
1978 births
Living people
English practitioners of Brazilian jiu-jitsu
Bodyguards